The Cook Islands has 22 government and 8 private schools. Government schools are split into primary schools, area schools, and secondary colleges. Private schools are primarily run by churches.

Government schools

Primary schools
 Arorangi School, Cook Islands
 Avarua School
 Avatea School
 Nikao School
 Rutaki School
 Takitumu School
 Araura Primary School
 Vaitau Primary School

Area schools
 Enuamanu School
 Lucky School, Palmerston Island
 Mangaia School
 Mauke School
 Mitiaro School
 Nassau School
 Niua School
 Omoka School
 Rakahanga School
 Tauhunu School
 Tetautua School
 Tukao School

Secondary colleges
 Tereora College
 Titikaveka College
 Araura College

Private schools
 Creative Centre Rarotonga
 Nukutere College
 Papaaroa High School
 Imanuela Akatemia Area school
 Apii Te Uki Ou Primary School
 St Joseph Primary School, Cook Islands
 Te Kaaroa SDA Primary School
 Blackrock Api’i Potiki Early Childhood Education Centre

References

Cook
Cook
Schools